Eleutherodactylus adelus is a species of frogs in the family Eleutherodactylidae. It is endemic to Cuba.

Its natural habitat is subtropical or tropical moist lowland forests. It is threatened by habitat loss.

References

adelus
Endemic fauna of Cuba
Amphibians of Cuba
Amphibians described in 2003
Taxa named by Stephen Blair Hedges
Taxonomy articles created by Polbot